FC Saint-Éloi Lupopo is a Congolese football club based in Lubumbashi. Their home games are played at Stade Kibassa Maliba.

Honours
Linafoot: 6
Winners (6): 1958, 1968, 1981, 1986, 1990, 2002
 Runner-up (3): 2005, 2006, 2009

Coupe du Congo
Winners (3): 1961, 1968, 2015
 Runner-up (3): 2007, 2014, 2017

SuperCoupe du Congo
Winners (1): 2002
 Runner-up (1): 2015
Katanga Provincial League (LIFKAT)
Winners (2): 2001, 2003

Performance in CAF competitions
CAF Champions League: 4 appearances
2003 – Second Round
2006 – Second Round
2007 – Preliminary Round
2010 – First Round

 African Cup of Champions Clubs: 4 appearances
1969 – Quarter-Finals
1982 – Semi-Finals
1987 – Second Round
1991 – First Round

CAF Confederation Cup: 5 appearances
2005 – First Round of 16
2006 – Group Stage
2011 – First Round of 16
2012 – First Round
2016 – First Round

CAF Super Cup: 0 appearances

Incidents at Matches

During a match with TP Mazembe in 2011, 14 people were killed during a stampede after spectators invaded the pitch as TP Mazembe equalized the score.

Most famous player: Pierre Mwana Kasongo who also played for Daring Faucons (Motema Pembe), was the first African player to become the top scorer in Belgium as he played for CS vervietois in 1962-63. He also played for ARA La Gantoise in Belgium. Mwana Kasongo successfully managed St Eloi Lupopo, TP Mazembe, Ruwenzori Natioanal, Makiso, Nika, Bilombe, and Sanga Balende, as well as the Leopards du Zaire. He was the first Congolese to be qualified as a Manager from the Academie Francaise de Football in France. He died on 13 January 1986 as he was managing St Eloi Lupopo.

References

External links

Football clubs in the Democratic Republic of the Congo
Association football clubs established in 1939
Football clubs in Lubumbashi
1939 establishments in the Belgian Congo
Sports clubs in the Democratic Republic of the Congo